Lindon J. Eaves (1944–2022) was a behavior geneticist and priest who has published on topics as diverse as the heritability of religion and psychopathology. His research encompasses the development of mathematical models reflecting competing theories of the causes and familial transmission of human human differences, the design of studies for the resolution, analytical methods for parameter estimation and hypothesis-testing and application to substantive questions about specific (human) traits. He was the first to consider standardized variance components for heritability estimates and was the first (at least in the human context) to consider the effects of living with a relative (with a different genotype or, in the case of monozygotic twins, the same genotype) on the behavior of a person. Furthermore, he was the first to think about genotype x age interaction and set up the algebra to study the effects of genes working in males as well as females, making it possible to use twins pairs of opposite-sex (dizygotic opposite sex). Together with Nick Martin, he wrote many classic papers, one of which is "The genetic analysis of covariance structure". They also wrote the book, Genes, culture and personality: An empirical approach. In 2012, a Festschrift was held in Edinburgh dedicated to Eaves' work; the proceedings were subsequently published in Behavior Genetics.

He was ordained a deacon in 1968, and a priest in 1969 by the Bishop of Birmingham, Church of England.  He served in the Church of England until 1981 and several churches in Richmond, Virginia including Church of the Holy Comforter, 1986–1997; St. James's, 1997; and St. Thomas, 2002–2013.

Early life
Eaves studied genetics at the University of Birmingham and theology at Ripon College Cuddesdon. He was professor in the Department of Psychology at the University of Oxford until 1981, when he moved to Virginia Commonwealth University where Walter Nance and Linda Corey had established the Virginia Twin Registry. In 1996, he and Kenneth Kendler founded the Virginia Institute for Psychiatric and Behavioral Genetics, where he is currently professor emeritus and actively engaged in research and training.

Honors

 1966: First class honors in Genetics, University of Birmingham
 1981: James Shields Award for Twin Research
 1989: Mead-Swing Lecturer, Oberlin College
 1991: President, Behavior Genetics Association
 1993: Paul Hoch Award, American Psychopathological Association
 1993-1995: President, International Society for Study of Twins
 1996: McNair Lecturer, University of North Carolina at Chapel Hill
 1999: Dobzhansky Award, Behavioral Genetics Association
 1999: Nobel Lecturer, Gustavus Adolphus College, Saint Peter, MN 'Genetics in the New Millennium'
 2000: Doctor Honoris Causa, VU University, Amsterdam, Netherlands
 2000: Root Lecturer, Washing & Lee University, Lexington, VA
 2001: VCU School of Medicine Outstanding Research Achievement Award
 2001: VCU Distinguished Scholarship Award
 2001: VCU School of Medicine Outstanding Departmental Teacher Award

References

External links
 Virginia Institute for Psychiatric and Behavioral Genetics

1944 births
Living people
Alumni of the University of Birmingham
Alumni of Ripon College Cuddesdon
Behavior geneticists
Academics of the University of Oxford
Virginia Commonwealth University faculty
People educated at King Edward VI Camp Hill School for Boys